Konstantinos Andriopoulos (12 May 1984 – 26 February 2011) was a Greek footballer who played as a goalkeeper.

Career
Andriopoulos signed in PAOK F.C. in January 2003. In 2004–05 was on loan in GS Marko. In the summer of 2005 released from PAOK F.C., he transferred in PAS Giannina but the transfer was cancelled. Finally he signed onto AS Rodos. In 2007–08 he played for Niki Volos GS and in 2008–09 he played for Olympiakos Volos. In 2009–10 he played for Veroia.

Death
Andriopoulos died on 26 February 2011 of leukemia.

References

External links
Profile at EPAE.org

1984 births
2011 deaths
Greek footballers
Deaths from leukemia
Deaths from cancer in Greece
Panachaiki F.C. players
Marko F.C. players
PAOK FC players
Rodos F.C. players
Nafpaktiakos Asteras F.C. players
Niki Volos F.C. players
Olympiacos Volos F.C. players
Veria F.C. players
Association football goalkeepers
People from Elis
Footballers from Western Greece